Machines is a 2016 documentary by Rahul Jain. The film, Jain's debut, examines factory life at a large textile mill in Gujarat, India.

Summary
The film's austere cinematography depicts a gritty factory environment where workers put in twelve hour shifts to make colorful fabrics. Interviews with the workers, interspersed with long shorts of the factory and its workers, "give the film a political edge."

Premiers
The film was released on 17 November 2016 at the International Documentary Film Festival Amsterdam and played in the United States at the Sundance Film Festival on 20 January 2017.

The New York premier of the film was at the Museum of Modern Art on 16 February 2017.

Reception and awards
The film has a 92% "Fresh" approval rating from Rotten Tomatoes based on 25 reviews.

Cinematographer Rodrigo Trejo Villanueva received the World Cinema Documentary Special Jury Award for Best Cinematography at the 2017 Sundance Film Festival for the film.

See also
Textile industry in India
Indian labor law

References

External links

Dialogue with Rahul Jain about the film at Variety.com

Indian documentary films
Films set in factories